DZMV-TV (channel 2) is a television station in Metro Manila, Philippines, serving as the flagship of the All TV network. It is owned and operated by Advanced Media Broadcasting System, which itself is owned by Prime Asset Ventures, Inc. through Planet Cable. The stations studios is located at the Starmall EDSA-Shaw, EDSA corner Shaw Boulevard, Mandaluyong, while its transmitter is located at the ABS-CBN-owned Millennium Transmitter site, Sgt. Esguerra cor. Mo. Ignacia Ave, Brgy. South Triangle, Diliman, Quezon City.

History

On January 5, 2022, the National Telecommunications Commission awarded the frequencies Channel 2 and Channel 16 to Advanced Media Broadcasting System under a provisional authority. The channels were previously owned by ABS-CBN Corporation under DWWX-TV. 

In June 2022, AMBS Manila started its test broadcast. 

In September 2022, Willie Revillame announced that the TV station will be named as All TV. The station made its soft launch on September 13, 2022.

Digital television

Digital channels
UHF Channel 16 (485.143 MHz)

Areas of coverage

Primary areas
 Metro Manila
 Cavite
 Bulacan
 Laguna
 Rizal

Secondary areas
 Portion of Pampanga
 Portion of Nueva Ecija

See also
DWWX-TV
ABS-CBN

References

Television channels and stations established in 2022
Television stations in Metro Manila